The Crepusculars (Italian: Poeti Crepuscolari "twilight poets") were a group of Italian post-decadent poets whose work is notable for its use of musical and mood-conveying language and its general tone of despondency.  The group's metaphorical name, coined by literary critic Giuseppe Antonio Borgese to refer to a condition of decline, describes a number of poets whose melancholic writings were a response to the modernization of the early 20th century.   

Their attitude represents a reaction to the content-poetry and rhetorical style of (Nobel Prize–winning poet) Giosue Carducci and Gabriele D'Annunzio, favouring instead the unadorned language and homely themes typical of Giovanni Pascoli.  An affinity existed with the French symbolists (see Paul Valéry, Arthur Rimbaud, and Stéphane Mallarmé).  It has been said that Guido Gozzano was the most competent exponent of the movement.  Other poets of the movement include Sergio Corazzini and Marino Moretti.

Period
Crepuscolars were active roughly between 1899, year of the release of Cesellature by Tito Marrone, and 1911, year that saw the publication of Colloqui by Guido Gozzano.

See also
Sergio Corazzini
Corrado Govoni
Guido Gozzano
Gian Pietro Lucini
Tito Marrone
Marino Moretti
Aldo Palazzeschi
Carlo Vallini
Futurism
Nino Oxilia

References 
William Rose Benét, The Reader's Encyclopedia, Thomas Y. Crowell.

Peter Brand and Lino Pertile, The Cambridge History of Italian Literature, Cambridge University Press.

Italian poetry
20th-century Italian literature
Italian literary movements